This is a list of the Turkey national football team results from 2000 to 2009.

2000

2001

2002

2003

2004

2005

2006

2007

2008

2009

Other unofficial games

Notes

Turkey national football team results